The Purdue University School of Aeronautics and Astronautics is Purdue University's school of aerospace engineering contained within the Purdue University College of Engineering.  The school offers BS, M.S., and PhD degrees in aeronautical and astronautical engineering and provides distance graduate education including online MS in Engineering with concentration in Aeronautics and Astronautics and a distance PhD.  Its main office and some of its labs are located in the Neil Armstrong Hall of Engineering. As of 2010, the School has awarded an estimated 6% of BS degrees and 7% of PhDs in aerospace engineering in the United States.

History 

Aeronautical engineering education and research at Purdue dates back to early 1920s when the Aeronautical Engineering courses were offered as part of Senior Aeronautical Option in the mechanical engineering program. By 1930s the course offerings in aeronautical engineering expanded to eight with many courses taught at the Purdue Airport, the world's first university-owned airport that opened in 1934. The formal four-year curriculum in aeronautical engineering was developed by World War II and in 1942, Mechanical Engineering became the "School of Mechanical and Aeronautical Engineering."   The school was officially established as a separate degree program on July 1, 1945.

Graduate education at the School began with a master's degree program in Aeronautical Engineering in 1946. Ph.D. program was approved for aerodynamics and propulsion in 1948, followed by the structures area in the early 1950s. Purdue's first Ph.D. in Aeronautical Engineering was awarded to R. L. Duncan in 1950 for his work with Professor Maurice Zucrow on the performance of gas turbines.

The school's present name was adopted in 1973.

Purdue students have built and restored several aircraft as part of the program. The sole Curtiss P-6 Hawk was restored by students and resides at the National Museum of the United States Air Force. In 1971 students restored a Ryan PT-22 Recruit, and completed a homebuilt Schreder HP-14 glider.

Notable alumni

Many of its graduates have gone on to become astronauts or other prominent members of the aerospace and defense industry.  Purdue University has graduated 24 astronauts, more than any other public institution, and 15 of those hold degrees from the aerospace department.  The only non-military institution to graduate more astronauts is the Massachusetts Institute of Technology.  One-third of all of NASA's crewed space flights have had at least one Purdue graduate aboard, and two of the six American astronauts to fly on the Russian space station Mir held Purdue degrees.

Astronauts with Purdue aerospace degrees
Neil A. Armstrong, B.S. in Aeronautical Engineering, 1955
John E. Blaha, M.S. in Astronautics, 1966
Roy D. Bridges, Jr., M.S. in Astronautics, 1966
Mark N. Brown, B.S. in Aeronautical and Astronautical Engineering, 1973
John H. Casper, M.S. in Astronautics, 1967
Roger B. Chaffee, B.S. in Aeronautical Engineering, 1957
Richard O. Covey, M.S. in Aeronautics and Astronautics, 1969
Guy S. Gardner, M.S. in Aeronautics and Astronautics, 1970
Henry Charles Gordon, B.S. in Aeronautical and Astronautical Engineering, 1950
Gregory J. Harbaugh, B.S. in Aeronautical and Astronautical Engineering, 1978
Beth Moses, B.S. and M.S. in Aeronautical and Astronautical Engineering, 1992 and 1994
Loral O'Hara, M.S. in Aeronautical and Astronautical Engineering, 2009 is a NASA astronaut candidate of the Class of 2017
Gary E. Payton, M.S. in Aeronautics and Astronautics, 1972 
Mark L. Polansky, B.S., M.S. in Aeronautical and Astronautical Engineering, 1978
Loren J. Shriver, M.S. in Astronautics, 1968
Charles D. Walker, B.S. in Aeronautical and Astronautical Engineering, 1971

Aerospace engineers and inventors

Paul Bevilaqua, the principal inventor of lift fan engine for the  Joint Strike Fighter F-35B
Gene Porter Bridwell, seventh director of NASA Marshall Space Flight Center
William H. Gerstenmaier, Associate Administrator for Space Operations for NASA
John L. Hudson, Program Director for Joint Strike Fighter
John H. McMasters
Jordi Puig-Suari, co-inventor of CubeSat
Daniel Raymer, a widely recognized expert in aircraft conceptual design

Business executives  
Mike Moses, President of Virgin Galactic

Others
John H. Griffith, Bell X-1 test pilot
Dennis Epple, American economist

Notable faculty

 Daniel Dumbacher, 20142017
 Amelia Earhart, 19351937
 Thomas N. Farris, 19862009
 Kathleen Howell
 Georgios Lianis, 19591978
 James Longuski
 Sergey Macheret
 R. Byron Pipes
 Shu Shien-Siu, 19681979
 David A. Spencer, 20162020
 David Wolf
 Karl Dawson Wood, 19371944
 Henry T. Yang, 19691994
 Maurice Zucrow, 19461953

Student organizations

The School of Aeronautics & Astronautics is also home to 9 student organizations that engage its members in a wide array of social, outreach, engineering and service activities. They are:

AAE Graduate Women's Gathering
The student organization formed in 2011 brings together graduate women in a comfortable setting for mentoring experiences to meet and share information and strategies for achievement of personal, academic, and professional success.

Aero Assist
Aero Assist is a student organization at Purdue University that caters to graduate students within the school of Aeronautics & Astronautics. A committee of 10 graduate students organizes several activities that are beneficial to graduate students such as the Research Symposium Series, the Graduate Mentor Program and recreational/leisure activities for the students.

Aeronautical and Astronautical Engineering Student Advisory Council
AAESAC serves to facilitate interactions and the relationship between faculty and the student body, to advise the administration on issues and concerns of students pertaining to the department, and generally strives to improve the school in hopes of enhancing the educational experience.

American Institute of Aeronautics & Astronautics
AIAA is the leading professional society for the field of aerospace engineering. The Purdue chapter works to support the institute's main objectives which is to advance the arts, sciences, and technologies pertaining to the aerospace field.

Amateur Student and Teacher Rocketry Organization
A.S.T.R.O is not only focused on research of solid fuel rocketry, but interacting with the community as well.

Purdue Space Day
Organized by university students, Purdue Space Day (PSD) is an annual educational outreach program, which provides school students in grades 3-8 the opportunity to learn about science, technology, engineering, and math (STEM) by participating in three age-appropriate activity sessions throughout the day.

Sigma Gamma Tau
SGT is the American honor society for engineering students. It was founded at Purdue University on February 28, 1953.  It seeks to identify and recognize achievement and excellence in the Aerospace field.

Students for the Exploration and Development of Space
SEDS is a prominent student-run international grass-roots movement dedicated to space advocacy. The Purdue chapter, known as the Purdue Space Program, oversees five rocketry teams, a satellite team, and promotes science outreach at local elementary schools and science centers as well as participating in space conferences such as Space Vision, NewSpace, and ISDC. Beginning in 2020, Purdue Space Program began hosting the Midwest Rocketry Forum, a podcast focusing on various stories in the space industry. Guests include Purdue alumnus, YouTube personalities, and United Launch Alliance CEO Tory Bruno. The chapter formerly hosted the Spring Space Forum, an event in which prominent members of industry, academic, and other space-related fields were invited to discuss a relevant issue. In the summer of 2022, the team began the first collegiate organization to fly a liquid methane / liquid oxygen rocket engine. The Boomie Zoomie B launch vehicle became the first liquid oxygen / liquid methane rocket to launch twice within 48 hours in June of 2022.

Women in Aerospace
The purpose of Women in Aerospace is to provide undergraduate women in the aerospace engineering program educational, social, and professional opportunities. WIA seeks to raise awareness of the gender disparity in aerospace engineering and encourage to learn more about how to create inclusive environments.

References

External links
Official website

Purdue University
West Lafayette, Indiana
1945 establishments in Indiana